The beaded ctenotus (Ctenotus rosarium)  is a species of skink found in Queensland in Australia.

References

rosarium
Reptiles described in 2002
Taxa named by Patrick J. Couper
Taxa named by Andrew P. Amey
Taxa named by Alex S. Kutt